The 1984 Dutch Grand Prix was a Formula One motor race held at Zandvoort on 26 August 1984. It was the thirteenth race of the 1984 Formula One World Championship.

The 71-lap race was won by Frenchman Alain Prost, driving a McLaren-TAG, after he started from pole position. Brazilian Nelson Piquet led the first ten laps in his Brabham-BMW before his oil pressure failed, after which Prost led the remainder of the race. His Austrian teammate Niki Lauda finished second, with Briton Nigel Mansell third in a Lotus-Renault. The 1-2 finish secured the Constructors' Championship for McLaren, their first since .

When this move was announced two days after the race, Toleman management were angered as Senna had not informed them of his intentions, and as a result they suspended him from the next race in Italy. It was also correctly rumoured that, with Jacques Laffite already known to be leaving Williams at the end of the season to return to Ligier, team owner Frank Williams had signed Mansell for 1985 alongside Keke Rosberg.

Classification

Qualifying

Race

Championship standings after the race 
Bold text indicates the World Champions.

Drivers' Championship standings

Constructors' Championship standings

References

Dutch Grand Prix
Grand Prix
Dutch Grand Prix
Dutch Grand Prix